Tolma is a monotypic genus of Malagasy nursery web spiders containing the single species, Tolma toreuta. It was first described by R. Jocqué in 1994, and is only found on Madagascar.

See also
 List of Pisauridae species

References

Monotypic Araneomorphae genera
Pisauridae
Spiders of Madagascar